P.A.O.K. Sports Arena is an indoor arena located in Pylaia, Thessaloniki, Greece, and it hosts the men's basketball, women's basketball, men's volleyball and women's volleyball departments of the multi-sports club PAOK.

PAOK Sports Arena is the largest privately owned arena in Greece. It was opened in 2000, and in the same year, it hosted the EuroLeague and Greek Cup final-fours. It is built on land donated by Ioannis Dedeoglou, for which P.A.O.K. B.C. holds an annual tournament in his honor. It has 8,142 seats for fans and 502 parking spots.

PAOK's volleyball department had to wait until 2002, to begin using the stadium. The arena also includes a training facility, club offices, shops, and a museum dedicated to PAOK basketball club. The arena was renovated in 2016.

Most of people usually call the arena "Palatáki" (which means "little palace"), due to its comforts and modern construction.

Directions to the stadium
The arena is located in southeast Thessaloniki, Greece, in the Pylaia borough, 7 km from the city centre, and around 1 km from Thessaloniki's International Airport. The arena lies 300 meters off the junction, on a small hill. OASTH's bus lines #2 (starts from KTEL) and #3 (starts from New Thessaloniki Railway Station) provide public transport to the arena. In the longer term, the stadium will also serve the Thessaloniki Metro with the Anotera Scholi Polemou metro station, which is planned to be near the arena.

Construction of PAOK Sports Arena 
P.A.O.K. B.C. had to wait 10 years from the laying of the arena's foundations (on March 18, 1990), and 12 years from the time Ioannis Dedeoglou donated the land (June 17, 1988), until the sports arena was complete.

Ioannis and his brother, Thanasis Dedeoglou, first began to think about a new major European sports arena in Thessaloniki in 1991, by donating land to PAOK. A proposal to host the 2000 FIBA EuroLeague Final Four in the new arena, increased the motivation to complete the stadium. FIBA Europe accepted the offer, and the construction was finished in time. The stadium also hosted, earlier that year, the 2000 Greek Cup Final Four, as its first major event.

Events held

First Ioannis Dedeoglou Tournament 
The first tournament took place in 2004, and four teams competed. They were Hemofarm, Panathinaikos, PAOK, and Ülker. The first games took place on September 24, 2004, in which Panathinaikos won against Hemofarm, by a score of 83–79, while PAOK beat Ülker, by a score of 77–57. The very next day, Hemofarm vs. Ulker and PAOK vs. Panathinaikos took place, to decide who would earn the final positions. Hemofarm beat Ulker by a score of 84–74, for its third-place finish, and PAOK beat Panathinaikos in a close game, by a score of 79–76, for first place.

Second Ioannis Dedeoglou Tournament 
The second tournament was held in September 2005. The teams that participated were AEK, FC Barcelona, Red Star Belgrade, and PAOK. On the first day of the tournament, fans got to see a Greek derby between PAOK and AEK, which PAOK won by a score of 77–72. The next game of the day took place between Barcelona and Red Star, in which Barcelona won 77–67. The following day, AEK was pitted against Red Star, and lost 54–75. The final was a real feast for the eyes, as it finished with both teams tied at 87 points; it was a great game, in which Barcelona ended up beating PAOK, in overtime, by a score of 102–101.

2000 Thessaloniki EuroLeague Final Four 

PAOK Sports Arena hosted the 2000 Thessaloniki FIBA EuroLeague Final Four.

Semifinals
Panathinikos Athens (GRE) – Efes Pilsen (TUR) 81–71
Maccabi Tel Aviv (ISR) – FC Barcelona (ESP) 65–51

Third place game
FC Barcelona (Spain) – Efes Pilsen 69–75 (Turkey)

Final
Panathinaikos Athens (Greece) – Maccabi Tel Aviv (Israel) 73–67

CEV Champions League Final Four
PAOK Sports Arena hosted the 2004–05 CEV Champions League Final Four, which took place from 26 to 27 March 2005.

Concerts
A number of concerts also take place in the arena. Artists that have performed at the arena include the Pet Shop Boys and Sakis Rouvas.
On the 18 September 2010, The Prodigy performed at the arena, with an attendance of 10,000 people. Moreover, on 27 October 2019 Enrique Iglesias' concert was sold.

Arena info
The arena's inaugural game was the 2000 Greek Cup semifinal between AEK Athens and Maroussi. AEK won the game, and subsequently went on to win the Greek Cup title.
The arena's first game featuring PAOK, took place on May 17, 2000, against Panathinaikos.
Maroussi player, Anatoly Zourpenko, scored the first points that were scored inside PAOK Sports Arena.
PAOK Sports Arena is the largest privately owned arena in Greece, that has been regularly used to host basketball games at one time or another. The Nikos Galis Olympic Indoor Hall, the Peace and Friendship Stadium, and the Ano Liosia Olympic Hall (the home arenas of Panathinaikos Athens, Olympiacos Piraeus, and AEK Athens) are larger, yet they are the property of the Greek state. Hellinikon Olympic Arena (previously the home arena of Panionios Nea Smyrni) is also larger, when it's in full capacity configuration, but it is also owned by the Greek state.

Gallery

See also
List of indoor arenas in Greece

References

External links

 Info on the arena at stadia.gr

Basketball venues in Greece
Handball venues in Greece
Indoor arenas in Greece
Sports venues completed in 2000
Sports venues in Thessaloniki
Volleyball venues in Greece